Marin Mägi-Efert (née Marin Mägi; born 22 May 1982 in Kadrina) is an Estonian actress.

In 2004 she graduated from the performing arts department of the Estonian Academy of Music and Theatre in Tallinn under instruction of Ingo Normet. From 2005 until 2016, she worked at Rakvere Theatre. Since 2016, she has been a freelance actress. Besides theatrical roles she has also appeared in television roles and played in several films.

Marin Mägi is married to radio journalist and presenter Elvis Efert. The couple have two children, a boy born in 2010 and a girl born in 2018.

Filmography

 2005-2006 Kodu keset linna (role: Sigrid)
 2008 Tuulepealne maa (role: Marju Pärtel)
 2014 See õige (role: Emma)
 2016 Ema (role: Sister)
 2018 Võta või jäta (role: Jaana)

References

Living people
1982 births
Estonian stage actresses
Estonian film actresses
Estonian television actresses
21st-century Estonian actresses
Estonian Academy of Music and Theatre alumni
People from Kadrina Parish